Markus Karl (born 14 February 1986) is a German professional footballer who plays as a midfielder for SV Alsenborn.

International career
Karl is a youth international for Germany.

References

External links
 

1986 births
Living people
People from Vilsbiburg
Sportspeople from Lower Bavaria
Association football midfielders
German footballers
Germany youth international footballers
Bundesliga players
2. Bundesliga players
3. Liga players
SpVgg Greuther Fürth players
Hamburger SV players
Hamburger SV II players
FC Ingolstadt 04 players
1. FC Union Berlin players
1. FC Kaiserslautern players
SV Sandhausen players
Footballers from Bavaria